This is a list of settlements in Ajman.

Ajman (city)
Al Hamidiyah (Ajman)
Hadhf
Manama (Ajman)
Masfout

References